Picault is a surname. Notable people with the surname include:

 , French comics artist
 Émile Louis Picault (1833–1915), French sculptor
 Fafà Picault (born 1991), American soccer player
 Lazare Picault, 18th century French explorer
  (born 1953), French television director